The following is a list of episodes for the Fresh TV Original Series, My Babysitter's a Vampire. It premiered on Télétoon (French), on February 28, 2011 and Teletoon on March 14, 2011, both as sneak peeks. It premiered on Disney Channel on June 27, 2011. The series is a supernatural drama, and is a follow-up to the film of the same name.

Series overview

Film

Episodes

Season 1: 2011

Season 2: 2012
Vanessa Morgan confirmed via Twitter that there will be a second season. It was later confirmed and that it consisted of 13 episodes. Season 2 began filming on September 21, 2011 and wrapped up on November 15, 2011. Season 2 was produced by Byron A. Martin who also acted as 2nd Unit Director on numerous episodes.
Disney Channel announced they would pick it up again for a second season.

The second season first premiered in the United States on Disney Channel on June 29, 2012, initially airing on Fridays at 8:30PM ET (7:30PM Central) before moving back to 7:30PM ET (6:30PM Central). Season two premiered in Canada on Teletoon on Thursday, September 6, 2012 at 7:30PM ET (6:30PM Central), three episodes later the series moved up to 8:00PM ET (7:00PM Central).

References

General references that apply to most episodes

External links
 at Teletoon
 at Disney Channel
List of My Babysitter's a Vampire Episodes at IMDb

Lists of Canadian television series episodes
Lists of fantasy television series episodes
Lists of Disney Channel television series episodes